Lesson's motmot (Momotus lessonii) or the blue-diademed motmot, is a colorful near-passerine bird found in forests and woodlands of southern Mexico to western Panama.  This species and the blue-capped motmot, whooping motmot, Trinidad motmot, Amazonian motmot, and Andean motmot were all considered conspecific.

Description
The central crown is black and surrounded by a blue band. There is a black eyemask. The call is a low owl-like ooo-doot.

These birds often sit still, and in their dense forest habitat can be difficult to see, despite their size. They eat small prey such as insects and lizards, and will also regularly take fruit.

Like most of the Coraciiformes, motmots nest in tunnels in banks, laying about three or four white eggs.

Subspecies
The Lesson's motmot has three subspecies:
 M. l. goldmani Nelson, 1900 -  southwestern Mexico to northern Guatemala
 M. l. exiguus Ridgway, 1912 -  Campeche and Yucatán (southern Mexico)
 M. l. lessonii Lesson, R., 1842 - Chiapas (southern Mexico) to western Panama

References

Lesson's motmot
Birds of Mexico
Birds of Central America
Birds of Belize
Birds of Guatemala
Birds of El Salvador
Birds of Honduras
Birds of Nicaragua
Birds of Costa Rica
Birds of Panama
Lesson's motmot
Taxa named by René Lesson